The Men's 1 km Time Trial B track cycling event at the 2016 Summer Paralympics took place on September 11. This class was for blind and visually impaired cyclists riding with a sighted pilot. Twelve pairs from 10 different nations competed.

Results

References

Men's 1 km time trial B